Unión de Curtidores (Spanish, Union of Tanners; nicknamed Curtidores) was a football club. The club was founded on August 15, 1928.

History
The club was founded on August 15, 1928. The club gained fame in the early 1930s by defeating local clubs in such a way that the board of directors tried to enroll the club in Mexican Primera División. It was not until 1943 when the club and the club's state of Guanajuato joined forces and created Union-Leon, which later become Club León. The club went on to keep the club's name and the colors and in 1967 joined the Segunda División Profesional. In the 1970-1971 tournament, the club finished 7th overall. In 1971-1972 the club finished one point away from being relegated. In 1972-1973 the club finished 8th overall.
In 1974-1975 they managed to qualify for the playoffs beating Club Leon 1-0, but fell to Toluca, who went on to become the champion that year.

Honours 
Liga de Ascenso: 1
1999

Segunda División Profesional: 1
1982-1983

Copa México de Segunda División Profesional: 1
1971

Kit evolution

First kit evolution

Footnotes

See also 
Football in Mexico

León, Guanajuato
Football clubs in Guanajuato
Association football clubs established in 1928
1928 establishments in Mexico